Boris Korneev (1929 or 1930 – 1968), known as The Strongman Killer, was a Soviet serial killer.

Biography

Before the murders 
The exact date and place of birth of Korneev is unknown (it is known that in 1968 he was 38 years old). He was distinguished by great physical strength and worked as a circus performer, juggling heavy weights and receiving ovations at the stage. At one point, however, he tore a tendon, abruptly ending his circus career. Despite this, Korneev still desired fame and was looking for ways to stay in the spotlight.

He began to write in Moscow newspaper announcements' want ads. Three women immediately responded to the announcements - Irina Schelkunova, Natalya Delyagina and Yulia Trofimova, the youngest being the 18-year-old Natalya Delyagina. As a child, she lived with her stepmother Galina, as her father had died when she was 13. After that, Galina kept Delyagina in sexual slavery: she asked local men to help her with the housework, soldered her stepdaughter with alcohol and made her have sex with the men who provided the services. Delyagina felt a great sense of shame and hated her stepmother, but did not tell anyone about her position, being completely under Galina's control. When she turned 18, Delyagina responded to the acquaintanceship announcement left by Korneev. Another woman, Yulia Trofimova, was divorced and with one daughter, Oksana, from her ex-husband. Trofimova was happy in her relationship with Korneev, considering him her protector.

Murders 
In 1968, Korneev lived in the city of Voskresensk, Moscow Oblast, cohabiting with the three women. He was unable to find a job, thus experiencing a growing sense of disappointment in his life. Eventually, Irina Schelkunova was impregnated by her roommate and began demanding him to marry her. Korneev was annoyed by her constant pestering about a wedding, and after another such conversation he strangled Schelkunova with a wire. At the time of her death, she was in the 20th week of pregnancy. The murderer then dragged the body onto the roof of an industrial building and dropped it onto a parked bus. The driver was having lunch at the time, and upon entering the bus, he failed to notice that there was a female body on the roof. Schelkunova's corpse fell on the asphalt at the next bus stop. The man tried to help her, but realized that she was dead. The suffocation marks were very rough, indicating she had been strangled with a wire or thick cord. Detectives became interested from where Schelkunova's corpse had fallen on the roof, with the driver explaining that he had had lunch near the industrial building that day. Traces from the corpse's dragging were found near the building, and it was possible to establish the victim's identity only a week after the body's discovery.

Schelkunova's mother said that her daughter often looked for acquaintance announcements in newspapers. In her house, investigators found several such ads. According to one of them, Sergei Poganovsky, an employee of the USSR Ministry of Culture, was identified, presenting himself as "Svyatoslav" in the announcement. When the criminal investigation officer Alexey Morozov came to him, Poganovsky's dog attacked the operative. Morozov shot the dog and detained Sergei. It turned out that the detainee made secret dating ads unbeknownst to his wife, had sex with the responding women and then threw them. Poganovsky had no credible alibi in Schelkunova's murder.

Shortly after the arrest of Poganovsky, Boris Korneev committed the second murder. After Natalya Delyagina told him that her stepmother Galina had abused her, he strangled the latter and tied her corpse to a construction car. The same strangulation marks were found on Galina's neck as those on the murdered Irina Schelkunova. An extremely large quantity of alcohol was found in the victim's blood, indicating that the perpetrator had forced her to drink it. Upon learning that Galina had sexually exploited her stepdaughter, the investigators suggested the possibility that Delyagina's lover could be the killer. She herself told the authorities that he might have committed another murder, but refused to give his name, as Delyagina considered her stepmother's killer a hero.

An operative, Sgt. Yury Markelov, was put on duty in Delyagina's house to catch the criminal. One night, Korneev came to the house and, upon seeing the operative, he strangled Markelov, despite the fact that the sergeant had training in boxing. After that, the maniac then kidnapped and subsequently strangled Delyagina. Her disappearance was announced in the All-Union search, and her body was soon found by a couple on a phosphogypsum mountain.

The murderer explained his long absence to Yulia Trofimova by claiming that he had gone to the neighbouring region to look for work. He began to torture Oksana, Trofimova's daughter, chaining her to an iron weight and forcing her to do push-ups. Once Oksana's father, Petr, came to visit Trofimova, he learned that his daughter was being abused and decided to investigate. As a result, he was strangled by Korneev and had his corpse hidden in a ravine. Oksana told her mother directly that she suspected Korneev of killing her father. After that, Korneev came at night to Trofimova's house, covered in phosphorus and glowing in the dark, in an effort to intimidate Trofimova and Oksana. Trofimova sent her daughter to her grandmother and called the police. Hearing this, Korneev beat up and tied his partner. Then the maniac called the grandmother, and when Oksana picked up, he told her the following:

Attack on Oksana Trofimova and death 
Oksana decided not to call the police, fearing that in that case Korneev would kill her mother, but instead turned towards her friend and classmate, Nikolay. They went to the designated place, armed with a hammer and a knife. Korneev took his wire, but Oksana then stabbed him in the chest. The offender stayed on his feet, but then received a blow from the hammer on the head by Nikolay. Withstanding this hit as well, Korneev hit Nikolay, making him stagger to the nearest tree. However, Korneev then fell on the ground. He survived, despite the huge amounts of blood loss, and was hospitalized. He was declared insane and was sent to a closed psychiatric hospital. A few weeks after his hospitalization, Korneev was strangled by his roommates.

Nikolay was also hospitalized and underwent several operations. After prolonged treatment, he was initially confined to a wheelchair, but soon one of his legs began to move. Oksana forced him to train, and he was able to re-learn to walk on his own. After that, they got married and had children together.

See also
 List of Russian serial killers

References

External links 
 The Strongman Killer

1968 deaths
Male serial killers
Murdered serial killers
People acquitted by reason of insanity
People convicted of murdering police officers
People from Voskresensk
People murdered in the Soviet Union
Soviet serial killers
Year of birth uncertain